Tom Nattermann (born 16 April 1993) is a German footballer who plays as a centre-forward for SV Babelsberg.

Career
Nattermann made his professional debut for Erzgebirge Aue in the 3. Liga on 25 July 2015, coming on as a substitute in the 78th minute for Nicky Adler in the 0–0 home draw against VfL Osnabrück.

References

External links
 Profile at DFB.de
 Profile at kicker.de
 RB Leipzig II statistics at Fussball.de

1993 births
Living people
People from Riesa
Footballers from Saxony
German footballers
Association football forwards
RB Leipzig players
RB Leipzig II players
FC Erzgebirge Aue players
FC Carl Zeiss Jena players
FC Energie Cottbus players
VfB Germania Halberstadt players
SV Babelsberg 03 players
3. Liga players
Regionalliga players